Selden is an unincorporated community in south central Erath County, Texas, United States, along Fm-913 between U.S. Routes 67 and 281, approximately  south-southeast of Stephenville. It was named after a man who owned a nearby ranch during the 1850s. Selden was granted a post office in the 1890s, and by 1900, the community had grown to near 100 residents. The post office disbanded in 1915 after significant population fluctuations. The population remained at around a steady 71 from 1980 through the 1990s. Through the 2000s, Selden maintained a Baptist church, a Methodist church, two cemeteries, a community center (formerly the Selden School), and a Volunteer Fire Department. It continues to be a primarily farming, dairy and ranching community.

Photo gallery

References 

 Upper Leon Firefighters Association shows Selden Vol. Fire Department as an active member.
 Three Way Independent School District
 Handbook of Texas Online Entry for Selden, Texas.
 Pleasant Hill United Methodist Church-Selden

Unincorporated communities in Texas
Unincorporated communities in Erath County, Texas